Rwegasira Oscar (born July 28, 1970) is a Tanzanian politician and a member of the CCM political party. He was elected MP representing Kagera in 2015. He is the chairman of the HIV Parliamentary Committee.

References 

1970 births
Living people
Chadema politicians
Chadema MPs
Tanzanian Roman Catholics